Phythian is an English surname of Roman origin meaning "son of Fithion" or Vivian. Notable people with the surname include:

Dylan Phythian (born 1995), Australian rugby league footballer
Ernie Phythian (1942–2020), English football player
Mark Phythian (born 1985), English cricket player
Robert L. Phythian (1835–1917), American naval officer

References